Karoli or Károli is a given name and a surname.  Notable people known by this name include the following:

Surname
Gáspár Károli (1529?–1591), Hungarian Calvinist pastor
Michael Karoli (1948–2001), German guitarist, violinist and composer
Saida Karoli (born 1976), Tanzanian singer

Given name
Karoli Hindriks (born 1983), Estonian entrepreneur

See also

Kaboli (disambiguation)
Kadoli (disambiguation)
Kakoli (disambiguation)
Kareli (disambiguation)
Karli (name)
Karol (name)
Karola
Karolin (name)
Karolis
Karolj